Korňa is a village and municipality in Čadca District in the Žilina Region of northern Slovakia.

Geography
Scenic village is situated in Beskydy Mountains, closely town Turzovka, location 18°32′10″ E, 48°24′42″ N, elevation above sea-level 559 m (community centre). It lies very near to Czech and Polish borderlines.

Climate
Climate is typical for this mountainous terrain—relatively cool with large annual rainfall. Ultra high snowfalls in the winter of 2005/2006 cut off this village from the rest of the country and actually required military help to dig out its inhabitants—a fact still deeply engraved in the memory of many citizens.

Territorial division
Korňa is unofficially divided to three parts - Korňa I, Korňa II, and Korňa III.  Fine segmentation used surnames of original owner/keeper of settlement, for example: U Šprčoka, Zlámaná, U Jendriskov, U Gajdoší, U Ďurkáčí, U Zelenkov, Hrtúsov, Dubačí, Sobčákov, Marcov, and so on. A community centre is situated between municipal office and local church, where are also guest-houses, apartments, shops, and pubs.

Speech
Local dialect is a mixture of Slovak, Czech, and Polish loan-words, idioms and terms, drawn from local (but rarely used) form of secret language of tinkers craftsmen called "krpoština."

Building, architecture, attractions, tourism

There are two churches - original wooden and new, modern church from 1994. Authentic dwelling was rustic wooden cottages. Former wooden pub is now in open-air museum at Vychylovka; still serve its original purpose. Local natural attraction is Korňa's petroleum spring -, which is highest Central-European spontaneous petroleum outflow. Citizens used this petroleum for lighting purposes; fellow used petroleum as conserve agent for his cottage. It never decomposed, however, it burned down. 

Korňa is also well-known of Holy place on Živčák Hill (Živčákova), where past century local man saw a Virgin Mary’s apparition. Thousands of people yearly wandered on this place; water springs has a miraculous effects.  In chapel (holy shrine) on Živčák's top are regularly saintly Masses. One from entry roads goes across Korňa's Calvary. Korňa, surrounded by mountains, is good tourist’s destination and mushroom collector’s paradise. Village has a very promising perspective of agro tourism expansion in the nearest period. Lot of people invests in this area to rusts, cottages and homes.  Accommodation information is presented at official site.

Economy and employment
In the past this was a poor region, a lot of citizens moved abroad, especially in inter-war period to the USA, post second world war to the Sudetes (for example Krnov). Previous regime decrease and inhibiting region’s development, the reason was very simple - people became as reserve workers especially for industrial areas at northern Moravia and region of Žilina. People used leave their homes to find work.

Transport
Hilly terrain gives opportunity reach the village at the route Turzovka - Klokočov. Direction from Makov is possible entrance through village Kelčov, part of way is in forest; off-road is strongly recommended. Bus connection:  from Turzovka meet to railroad Čadca - Žilina.

History
Until 1954, Korňa was borough of municipality named Turzovka. Turzovka used to be the largest "village" municipality in the entire former Czechoslovakia. When Korňa separated from the greater municipality of Turzovka is not known (please add). Current Korňa is formed by incorporating two boroughs of Lower Korňa (Nižná Korňa) and Upper Korňa (Vyšná Korňa) into single municipality, currently subdivided into three administrative boroughs.

Genealogical resources

The records for genealogical research are available at the state archive "Statny Archiv in Bytca, Slovakia"

See also
 List of municipalities and towns in Slovakia

External links
Surnames of living people in Korna

Villages and municipalities in Čadca District